Mars is the third Mini-Album for the Japanese rock duo B'z, released in 1991. The album sold 1,730,500 copies in total, reaching #1 at Oricon.

Track listing 
 - 5:03
Mars - 1:24
Loving All Night ~Octopus Style~ - 5:50
Love & Chain ~Godzilla Style~ - 5:45
Lady Navigation ~Cookie & Car Stereo Style~ - 5:12

Certifications

References 

B'z EPs
1991 EPs
Japanese-language EPs